Vysotsk is a village in western Ukraine, in Sarny Raion of Rivne Oblast, but was formerly administered within Dubrovytsia Raion. As of the year 2001, the community had 2235 residents. The postal code is 34111, and the KOATUU code is 5621882001.

History
During the liquidation of its ghetto on September 9, 1942, 1,600 to 1,800 Jews were killed in Vysotsk. The mass shooting was perpetrated by the Security Police of Pinsk. The Jews were in two graves about 2.5 kilometers outside of town. The Gendarmerie and local police forces from Stolin, Vysotsk and Davidgrodek participated in this Aktion.

References

External links 
 Article Wysock in the Geographical Dictionary of the Kingdom of Poland, Volume XIV (Worowo — Żyżyn), 1895 year 
 Weather in the Vysotsk 
 Vysotsk Silska Rada in the site «Panorama Biznesu» 
Volhynian Governorate
Wołyń Voivodeship (1921–1939)
Holocaust locations in Ukraine

Villages in Sarny Raion